The air-to-cloth ratio is the volumetric flow rate of air (m3/minute; SI m3/second) flowing through a dust collector's inlet duct divided by the total cloth area (m2) in the filters. The result is expressed in units of velocity.

The air-to-cloth ratio is typically between 1.5 and 3.5 metres per minute, mainly depending on the concentration of dust loading.

External links
Details on how to calculate air-to-cloth ratio

Filters
Engineering ratios